Thibaud is a name of French origin, a form of Theobald.

Surname 
 Anna Thibaud (1861–1948), French singer. 
 Jacques Thibaud (18801953), French violinist
 Laure Thibaud (born 1978), French synchronized swimmer
 Marcel Thibaud (18961985), French politician
 Todd Thibaud (born before 1987), American singer-songwriter

Personal name 
 Thibaud II (Theobald II, Count of Champagne, 10901152)
 Thibaud III (Theobald III, Count of Champagne, 11791201)
 Thibaud IV (Theobald I of Navarre, 120153), Count of Champagne and King of Navarre
 Thibaud Le Chansonnier (Theobald II of Navarre, (123970), King of Navarre
 Thibaud Chapelle (born 1977), French international rower
 Thibaud Gaudin (122992), French Grand Master of the Knights Templar

Other uses 
 Long-Thibaud-Crespin Competition, an international classical music competition for pianists, violinists and singers that has been held in France since 1943
 Saint-Thibaud-de-Couz, a commune of the Savoie department in the Rhône-Alpes region in south-eastern France
 Thibaud, Dominica, a village
 Thibaud River, a river on the Caribbean island of Dominica

See also 
 Thibault (disambiguation)
 Thibaut
 Thibeault (disambiguation)
 Thiébaut (disambiguation)
 

French-language surnames